The atpB RNA motif is a conserved RNA structure that was discovered by bioinformatics.
atpB motifs are found in Corynebacteriaceae.

These RNAs are consistently located upstream of atpB genes, which encode a protein that is part of ATP synthase.  Therefore, it is possible that atpB RNAs regulate these genes as cis-regulatory elements.

References

Non-coding RNA